Stargate is a side-scrolling shooter game released for arcades in 1981 by Williams Electronics. Created by Eugene Jarvis and Larry DeMar, it is a sequel to Defender which was released earlier in the year. It was the first of only three productions from Vid Kidz, an independent development house formed by Jarvis and DeMar. Some of home ports of Stargate were renamed to Defender II for legal reasons.

This sequel adds new ships to the alien fleet, including Firebombers, Yllabian Space Guppies, Dynamos, Phreds, Big Reds, Munchies and Space Hums. The Defender ship is now equipped with an Inviso cloaking device, which renders the ship invulnerable when activated, but has a limited charge. A Stargate transports the ship to any humanoid in trouble. There are two special stages: the Yllabian Dogfight, first appearing at wave 5 and recurring every 10 waves; and the Firebomber Showdown, first appearing at wave 10 and also recurring every 10 waves.

Gameplay

The player flies a small spaceship above a scrolling, mountainous landscape which wraps around, so flying constantly in one direction will eventually return to the starting point. The player's ship flies in front of the landscape and does not contact it.

The terrain is inhabited by a small number of humanoids. Enemy ships fly overhead. The goal is to destroy the enemies to prevent the humans from being captured.

The player is armed with a beam-like weapon which can be fired rapidly in a long horizontal line ahead of the spaceship, and also has a limited supply of smart bombs, which can destroy every enemy on the screen. The player also has a limited supply of "Inviso" cloaking energy, which makes the ship invisible, and able to destroy any ships it comes in contact with.

At the top of the screen is a mini-map, which displays the positions of all aliens and humans on the landscape.

Aliens

There are fifteen types of aliens:
Lander - The primary enemy on every level. Landers teleport into the level in staggered waves, and attempt to capture humanoids by descending upon them and dragging them into the air; if they make it to the top of the screen with a human, the two fuse together into a more dangerous Mutant. Landers can fire projectiles at the player.
Mutant - A mutated Lander. Mutants home in on the player at constant speed, firing projectiles. They move erratically, making them difficult to shoot.
Baiter - A flat, iridescent spacecraft that teleports in if the player is taking too long to complete a level. Homes in on the player and attempts to match their speed, whilst firing accurate projectiles. A difficult opponent due to its unbeatable speed and tiny horizontal cross-section, which makes it very hard to shoot.
Bomber - A box-shaped alien that lays stationary mines in the air.
Pod - A star-like alien that bursts into a number of Swarmers when shot.
Swarmer - A tiny teardrop-shaped alien that moves very quickly in an undulating fashion. Difficult to shoot.
Firebomber - A rotating variation on the Bomber, which shoots high speed Fireballs at the player.
Yllabian Space Guppie - An undulating attacker, which attacks in swarms and homes in on the ship.
Phreds and Big Reds - Square aliens which look like they are constantly opening and closing their mouths.  Similar to the Firebombers, they launch tiny versions of themselves called Munchies.
Dynamos - Diamond shaped ships composed of clusters of Space Hums, which periodically break off to attack the ship independently.
Once all aliens (except Fireballs, Space Hums, Baiters, Phreds, Big Reds and Munchies) are destroyed, the player progresses to the next level.

Humanoids
The game starts with ten Humanoids inhabiting the planet. Landers will attempt to capture and fuse with them during play.

To rescue a Humanoid from capture, the player must kill the Lander holding it while it is in the air, causing the Humanoid to drop. At low height Humanoids can survive the drop on their own, but if the Lander is killed at too high an altitude, the player must catch the Humanoid with their ship and return him to the ground, otherwise he will not survive the drop. A player's ship can carry as many Humanoids as are alive on that level.

The Humanoids can be killed by the player's weapon just as easily as the aliens can, so careful aim is required when firing near them.

If all Humanoids are killed, the entire planet explodes, leaving the player in empty space. This also has the unfortunate effect of turning every Lander into a Mutant, making the player's job very difficult.

Every time the player completes 5 waves of enemies (i.e. at wave 6, 11, 16 and so forth), the planet (and all its 10 Humanoids) is restored.

Scoring
As well as the points gained by killing aliens, scores are also awarded for the following:
 Humanoid falling back to the ground without dying: 250 points
 Catching a falling humanoid: 500, 1000, 1,500, and 2,000 points, depending on number of humanoids carried at the time.
 Returning a humanoid to the ground: 500 points
 Humanoid surviving the level: 100 points per humanoid for 1st wave, 200 per humanoid on 2nd wave up to a maximum of 500 points from 5th wave onwards
 End-of-wave humanoid bonus: If all enemies are destroyed and a humanoid is falling to the ground, the player receives a 2,000 point bonus if the ship is positioned at ground level directly under the humanoid so as to simultaneously catch the humanoid and place it back on the ground. If the player simply catches the humanoid in mid-air while above the ground, the wave ends with the player only receiving the 500 points for catching the humanoid.
If you accumulate 999 ships in memory and get awarded your next ship, the game eliminates all your ships but the one you get awarded and the one you are playing with.

By default, the player receives an extra life, smart bomb, and Inviso energy every 10,000 points. This amount can be overridden when the machine is in maintenance mode. As in Defender, at 9,990,000, the same bonuses are given per enemy destroyed.

Controls
The control system of Stargate expands on that of the Defender arcade game. It has a joystick to move up and down, a 'Reverse' button to toggle the player's horizontal direction, and a 'Thrust' button to move in that direction. There is also a Fire button for shooting, a button to activate a smart bomb, a button to turn on the Inviso cloaking device, and a hyperspace button which teleports the player to a random position in the level, at a risk of either exploding upon rematerialization, or materializing onto an enemy or enemy projectile.

The Stargate
A central feature of the gamefield is the Stargate itself, represented by a series of concentric rectangles.  The operation of the Stargate depends on the current game conditions.

If a Lander is in the process of abducting a Humanoid, flying into the Stargate will teleport the ship to where the Humanoid is under attack. If more than one Humanoid is being captured, the ship will be taken to the Lander that is closest to the top of the screen. If a Humanoid is being captured while a Humanoid is falling to the ground, the ship will be taken to the Humanoid that is falling to the ground. Otherwise, entering the Stargate will teleport the ship to the opposite side of the planet.

If the ship is carrying at least four humanoids, entering the Stargate will "warp" the game ahead three levels. This allows more advanced players to skip the easier lower levels and also get a great number of points, extra lives, smart bombs and inviso energy. Warping is only allowed in the first 10 levels and can be avoided (if desired) by flying into the Stargate in reverse so a player can instead continue in the current level.

Ports
Ports of Stargate were being developed for the Atari 5200 console and the Atari 8-bit family of computers by Atari, Inc. programmer Steve Baker in 1984. The game was also ported to the Commodore 64, Apple II, and IBM PC.

The Family Computer port developed by HAL (renamed Star Gate, later named Defender II for US release) seems to be related to their Millipede (renamed Milli-Pede, later named back to Millipede for US release) and Joust ports, as well as Mike Tyson's Punch-Out!!, all of which were released around the same time. In particular, the title jingle for Milli-Pede/Star Gate/Joust are almost identical, the music played when Star Gate begins is a longer version of the opponent entrance music within Punch-Out!!, and the music played during Star Gate's intermission screen between waves is the same as the screen after a loss in Punch-Out!!.

Name change 
The Defender II name was used in some home releases, due to legal issues (according to the bonus material for Midway Arcade Treasures, Williams wanted to "make sure they could own the trademark" on the Defender name). The name Defender II has been used on many home ports and game compilation appearances, but not in arcades. The Atari 2600 port was originally sold as Stargate, but was renamed to Defender II for a later re-release.

Reception
Computer and Video Games scored the Atari VCS version 89% in 1989. In 1996, GamesMaster ranked the arcade version 82nd on their "Top 100 Games of All Time."

Legacy

In July 2000, Midway licensed Defender II, along with other Williams Electronics games, to Shockwave for use in an online applet to demonstrate the power of the Shockwave web content platform, entitled Shockwave Arcade Collection. The conversion was created by Digital Eclipse. It is currently not freely available to be played within the shockwave web applet.

As Defender II, the game is included in the 2012 compilation Midway Arcade Origins.

In popular culture
A Stargate machine is featured in the 3rd-season episode "Arcade" of the TV comedy series NewsRadio, in which it was referred to as "Stargate Defender". Eugene Jarvis, the game's creator, had a cameo role on the episode as "Delivery Guy #3".

Stargate and its predecessor Defender are featured as plot points in the podcast Rabbits.

Stargate also appeared in the 1983 movie Strange Invaders.

See also

 Williams Arcade's Greatest Hits

References

External links 

Stargate on Coinop.org
Defence Condition - open source GDI-based Stargate clone for Win32
Twin Galaxies High Score Rankings for Stargate

1981 video games
Apple II games
Arcade video games
Atari 2600 games
Cancelled Atari 5200 games
Cancelled Atari 8-bit family games
Commodore 64 games
Midway video games
Nintendo Entertainment System games
Horizontally scrolling shooters
Video game sequels
Williams video games
Video games developed in the United States
Multiplayer and single-player video games
HAL Laboratory games